WEBI-LP is a Religious-formatted broadcast radio station licensed to Woodlawn, Virginia, serving Woodlawn and Hillsville in Virginia.  WEBI-LP is owned and operated by Apple Enterprise, Inc.

References

External links
 

2015 establishments in Virginia
Radio stations established in 2015
EBI-LP
EBI-LP
Carroll County, Virginia